The Manx National Party was an offshoot of Mec Vannin, a nationalist party in the Isle of Man.  Divisions within Mec Vannin caused the split in 1977, and the single Mec Vannin member of the House of Keys (Peter Craine) transferred his loyalties to the new party.  When Craine ceased to be an MHK in 1981 the Manx National Party soon ceased to exist.

Separatism in the Isle of Man
Secessionist organizations in Europe
Celtic nationalism
National Party
Defunct political parties in the Isle of Man